Events in the year 2021 in Sweden.

Incumbents 
 Monarch – Carl XVI Gustaf
 Prime minister – Stefan Löfven, Magdalena Andersson

Events 
Ongoing — COVID-19 pandemic in Sweden

 31 January – Sweden loses to Denmark in the final of the 2021 World Men's Handball Championship, winning silver in the competition.
 3 March – Vetlanda stabbing attack: A man in his twenties injures 7 people with an axe in Vetlanda. He was shot and wounded by police before being arrested.
 22–28 March – 2021 World Figure Skating Championships were held in Stockholm.
 1 April – Kalix train station is opened.
 21 June – Swedish government crisis.
 29 June – Sweden national football team are knocked out of the UEFA Euro 2020 competition at the Round of 16 by Ukraine.
 8 July – A single-engine DHC-2 Beaver carrying 8 skydivers plus 1 pilot crashed shortly after takeoff from Örebro Airport. All 9 people died.
 22 August – Stefan Löfven announces that he will resign as Prime Minister in November 2021.
 28 September – An explosion occurs in Annedal in Gothenburg.
 3 October – Lars Vilks dies together with two guards in a car crash on European route E4 in Markaryd.
 14 October – The Swedish Police Authority presents a new list of Vulnerable areas, Klockaretorpet in Norrköping and Rannebergen in Gothenburg are removed while Valsta, Fisksätra, Visättra and Grantorp in Stockholm are added.
 30 November: Magdalena Andersson replaces Stefan Löfven as Prime Minister of Sweden, making her the first woman ever to hold that position.
 27 November to 5 December – 2021 Women's World Floorball Championships in Uppsala.
 6 December – A photo published by Nyheter Idag of the Minister for Public Administration Ida Karkiainen doing a Nazi salute in 2004 becomes a political scandal.
 13 December – Two vessels collide of the coast of Ystad.

Anniversaries 
 400 years since the establishment of Gothenburg as a city, getting town privileges in 1621. The planned Gothenburg quadricentennial jubilee has been postponed till 2023, due to the ongoing COVID-19 pandemic.

Deaths

January 
  
 
 10 January – Thorleif Torstensson, singer (b. 1949).
 11 January – Tord Peterson, actor (b. 1926).
 12 January – Mona Malm, actress (b. 1935).
 16 January – Lars Westman, writer (b. 1934).
 18 January – Thorsten Johansson, Olympic sprinter (b. 1950).
 21 January
 Evert Båge, military officer (b. 1925).
 Solveig Nordström, archeologist (b. 1923).
 24 January
 Gunnel Lindblom, actress (b. 1931).
 Sigvard Marjasin, civil servant (b. 1929).
 26 January – Lars Norén, playwright, novelist and poet (b. 1944).
 27 January – Gert Blomé, ice hockey player (b. 1934).
 28 January – Annette Kullenberg, journalist and author (b. 1939).

February 
  
  
 3 February – Margreth Weivers, actress (b. 1926).
 4 February – Frank Baude, politician, leader of the Communist Party (b. 1936).
 13 February – Olle Nygren, speedway rider (b. 1929).
 19 February – Ebba Andersson, footballer (Öxabäcks, national team) (b. 1935).

March 
 
 5 March
 Stig Malm, trade unionist, chairman of LO (1983–1993) (b. 1942).
 Birgitta Rasmusson, television personality and cookbook author (b. 1939).
 6 March – Bengt Åberg, motocross racer (b. 1944).
 7 March – Lars-Göran Petrov, heavy metal singer (Entombed, Entombed A.D., Firespawn) (b. 1972).
 15 March – , weightlifter and reality television contestant (Expedition Robinson) (b. 1946).
 16 March – Berit Carlberg, stage actress (Nine) (b. 1942).
 26 March – Lennart Larsson, cross country skier, Olympic bronze medalist (1956) (b. 1930).
 28 March
 , singer and musician (b. 1981).
 , musician, music writer and playwright (b.1927).

April 
 
 
 1 April – Nemam Ghafouri, physician, activist and humanitarian (b. 1968).
 4 April – Ingela Lind, art critic and author (b. 1943).
 6 April – Maj Britt Theorin, politician, MP (1971–1995) and MEP (1995–2004) (b. 1932).
 10 April
 Börje Holmberg, educator and writer (b. 1924).
 Bosse Skoglund, drummer (Peps Persson) (b. 1936).
 11 April – Berta Magnusson, writer and playwright (b. 1928).
 14 April
 , doctor and left-wing political activist (b. 1937).
 Inga Sarri, actress (b. 1934).
 20 April – Sven-Olof Olson, Air Force officer (b. 1926).
 24 April – Riitta Vainionpää, textile artist (b. 1952).

May 
 5 May – Bertil Johansson, footballer (IFK Göteborg, national team) (b. 1935).
 10 May
 Lars-Gunnar Bodin, electronic musician (b. 1935).
 Svante Thuresson, jazz musician ("Nygammal vals") (b. 1937).

June 
 
 9 June – Torgny Björk, musician, composer and singer (b. 1938).
 11 June – Sara Wedlund, Olympic long-distance runner (1996) (b. 1975).
 13 June – Sven Erlander, mathematician (b. 1934).
 16 June
 Bengt Göransson, politician (b. 1932).
 , music journalist (b. 1970).
 19 June – Ove Emanuelsson, Olympic sprint canoer (1960, 1964, 1968) (b. 1941).
 23 June – Med Reventberg, actress (Ronia, the Robber's Daughter) (b. 1948).
 27 June – Peps Persson, musician (b. 1946).
 30 June – Inge Danielsson, footballer (Helsingborg, Ajax, national team) (b. 1941).

July 
 18 July – Tommy Engstrand, sports journalist and television host (b. 1939).
 20 July
 Curt-Eric Holmquist, conductor (Lotta på Liseberg), Eurovision Song Contest winner (1984) (b. 1948).
 , journalist and news editor (b. 1946).
 23 July – Claes Reimerthi, comic writer (The Phantom) (b. 1955).
 31 July – Kenneth Johansson, politician and MP (1998–2012) (b. 1956).

August 
 4 August
 Åke Lundqvist, actor (Beck – Mannen med ikonerna) (b. 1936).
 Anders Pettersson, musician (Lasse Stefanz) (b. 1952).
 10 August – Gun Ädel, Olympic cross-country skier (1964) (b. 1938).
 11 August – Göran Zachrisson, sports journalist, cancer (b. 1938).
 25 August – Gunilla Bergström, author of Alfie Atkins (b.1942).

October 
 21 October – Einár, 19, rapper (shot)
 27 October – Benjamin Vallé, 47, musician (Viagra Boys)

References 

 
2020s in Sweden
Years of the 21st century in Sweden
Sweden
Sweden